Jazz Hall of Fame may refer to:

 Alabama Jazz Hall of Fame, an organization based in Birmingham, Alabama
 Oklahoma Jazz Hall of Fame, an organization based in Tulsa, Oklahoma
 Big Band and Jazz Hall of Fame (1978–2004), a defunct annual recognition in San Diego County, California
 Down Beat Jazz Hall of Fame, sponsored by Down Beat magazine since 1952
 Nesuhi Ertegun Jazz Hall of Fame, sponsored by Jazz at Lincoln Center